Liu Lu (born 2 April 1989) is a professor of mathematics at Central South University in Changsha, Hunan, where he is China's youngest full university Professor. As a 22-year-old undergraduate student Lu proved that
Ramsey theorem for infinite graphs (the case n = 2) with 2-coloring
does not imply
WKL0 over RCA0,
solving an open problem left by English logician David Seetapun in the 1990s. For this he was instantly promoted to full professor in the department where he was studying, and awarded a prize of 1 million renminbi. Some established professors were critical of his appointment voicing concern that he was too young, had no teaching experience and that the appointment was mostly designed to get media attention to Liu's university.

References

External links

1989 births
Living people
21st-century Chinese mathematicians
Academic staff of the Central South University
Educators from Liaoning
People from Dalian
Mathematicians from Liaoning